Silsden is a town and civil parish in the City of Bradford in West Yorkshire, England, on the River Aire and Leeds and Liverpool Canal between Keighley and Skipton, which had a population of 8,268 at the 2011 Census. The parish includes the hamlet of Brunthwaite.

History 
Silsden was mentioned in the 1086 Domesday Book as "Siglesdene", and as the most important village in Craven.

Generally an agricultural area, the Industrial Revolution had a significant impact on West Yorkshire, including Silsden. The town hosted a number of mills none of which now operate in their original form. There is still industry in the town, some in old mill buildings and some in a new industrial estate between the town and the river. The town retains a very small amount of  manufacturing.

The Leeds and Liverpool Canal became a key element of local infrastructure upon its completion in 1816.  Silsden was then connected to both a significant manufacturing city (Leeds) and a major ocean port (Liverpool) by canal. Canal boats allowed for cheap transportation of bulk goods, especially coal and wool, to the area.

In 1911, there was a riot in Silsden when the police station was attacked. A very unpopular policeman had been too enthusiastic in his duties. Questions were raised in the House of Commons and it was reported in the national press. The policeman was removed from the town and no more trouble occurred.

During the 1940s, a hostel was built off Howden Road, to house refugees and prisoners of war from various countries. The area is now a housing estate, and there is a plaque to commemorate the hostel on Ings Way.

In 1998, a hoard of 27 gold coins dating back to the 1st century AD were found in the town and subsequently valued at £20,000 by experts appointed by the Department of Culture, Media and Sport.

However this has since been beaten.

On 6 July 2014, Stage 2 of the 2014 Tour de France from York to Sheffield, passed through the town.

Brunthwaite 
Land here formed a small manor from Saxon times, and the first known written mention of the name (as Bronthweyt) occurs in the 14th century. The oldest buildings in the present settlement are from an 18th-century farming community. The hamlet was designated as a conservation area in 1977, which was reassessed by Bradford Council in 2005.

Governance
The town is part of the Craven ward of the Metropolitan borough of the City of Bradford, part of the Metropolitan county of West Yorkshire.

Community 

Silsden has been administered by the City of Bradford Metropolitan District Council since 1974. It also has its own town council which is based at Silsden Town Hall.

Silsden has eight public houses: the Robin Hood, the Counting House, the Red Lion, the Duck Pond, the Post Office, the Butchers Arms, the Punch Bowl, and the King's Arms. There are two members' clubs: Sunnybank Social Club and Twisters Social Club.

The station provides a link for commuters to the cities of Leeds and Bradford.

Lying between Keighley and Ilkley, Silsden is served by buses to both these towns. Silsden's public transport benefits from Silsden being part of West Yorkshire rather than North Yorkshire, the border of which runs along one end of the town.

Notable people 
The Lampkin family lived at Silsden during the Second World War. Lampkin brothers Arthur, Alan and Martin were, later, national motorcycle trials champions. Martin Lampkin won the 1975 FIM Trial World Championship and his son, Douglas "Dougie" Lampkin, is a twelve-time trials world champion.

The Wainman family, a second motorsport dynasty from Silsden, compete in BriSCA Formula 1 Stock Cars. Frankie Wainman was World Champion in 1979, while his son Frankie Wainman Junior is one of the most successful drivers in the history of the sport.

English rugby league player Jack Reed, who played for the Brisbane Broncos, was born in Silsden.

Henry Price started his first Fifty Shilling Tailors shop in Silsden. With this fortune, the now Sir Henry Price, bought Wakehurst Place, Ardingly, West Sussex, which is now owned by the National Trust.

Margaret Wintringham, née Longbottom, was a British Liberal Party politician. She was the second woman take her seat in the House of Commons and lived in Silsden when her father was the head teacher at Bolton Road School.

Television 
On 27 April 1995, a one-off anthology supernatural drama titled Chiller aired, in which episode 6, titled "number 6", featured Silsden. It was featured for almost the entire one-hour episode, using locations across the town.

Bonapartes Restaurant, on Kirkgate, was the subject of the first-ever episode of Gordon Ramsay's Kitchen Nightmares in 2004. After the show aired, Bonapartes’ owner Sue Ray threatened to take legal action against Ramsay, Channel 4 and the programme makers, Optomen, after claiming that the show put her £400,000 in debt. Christine Hall, producer of Kitchen Nightmares, refused to accept the blame, stating Ray only had herself to blame. The programme revisited the restaurant in the second series, but Ray would only talk to Ramsay off-camera. In June 2006, Ramsay won a High Court case against the London Evening Standard, which had alleged, after reports from Ray, that scenes and the general condition of Bonapartes had been faked. Ramsay was awarded £75,000 plus costs. Ramsay said at the time: "I won't let people write anything they want to about me. We have never done anything in a cynical, fake way."

In July 2007, the butchers, barbers and shoe shop located on Bradley Road were used in an episode of ITV's The Royal.

See also
Listed buildings in Silsden

References

External links 

 silsdenbuzz.co.uk - Local Community Website and info.
 Silsden.net - Local resource
 

 
Towns in West Yorkshire
Civil parishes in West Yorkshire
Geography of the City of Bradford